Croner Group is a British company that is active in the four areas of human resources, health and safety, procurement, employment and education law,

History

Early history
Croner Publications Ltd was established in 1941 by Ulrich Horst Edward Croner. The Company's first publication was a newsletter, Shippers Overseas Correspondence. Later, as a consequence of increasing wartime controls, Mr Croner compiled all the information needed by exporters and importers into the “Reference Book for Shippers”. The next 20 years saw the publication of four more loose-leaves: the Reference Book for Employers (1955), the World Directory of Freight Conferences, The Reference Book for Importers and Road Transport Operation.

The modern history of Croner can be said to date from 1976 when Mrs Croner appointed her nephew, Andrew Brode, as the new managing director. Brode set about expanding the marketing effort and raising the profile of the loose-leaf as an information delivery system. The increased profitability attracted the attention of UK and European publishers and in 1977 Brode negotiated the acquisition of Croner by a Dutch group ICU. In 1982 ICU subsequently changed its name to the Wolters Samson Group, and in 1987 combined with Kluwer to form Wolters Kluwer.

1980s
The 1980s saw an increase in Croner's activities into a new subject areas such as catering, health and safety, schools management and premises management. Led by Petre Sefton, Croner expanded into law-for-business. She oversaw the move to Kingston.

1990s
In 1999 the company acquired IRPC Group Limited, active in employment, health and safety, compliance and taxation matters. Dennis Hunt identified a demand for advisory and compliance services in response to increasing employment legislation and trade union activity in the 1970s.

2000s
In 2000 IRPC was rebranded to Croner Consulting alongside several other acquired units.

Peninsula Business Services bought Croner Group from Wolters Kluwer in late 2015. Peninsula has a presence in Australia, New Zealand, Ireland and the UK.

Croner's human resources (HR) services support provide software and employment tribunal assistance. Health and safety advisors provide help with compliance, audits and also offer crisis support in the event of an incident. Croner partner with over 130 associations to allow their members access to additional services, having formed a strategic alliance with the Recruitment and Employment Confederation (REC).

The IRPC brand (now Croner) primarily concentrates on offering fee protection insurance, a scheme that covers the clients of an accountancy practice for any professional fees that result from an investigation by HM Revenue and Customs.

References

External links
 

Croner Group
Companies based in Leicestershire
1941 establishments in England